Ari Devon Sandel (born September 5, 1974) is an American filmmaker. He is known for directing the short film West Bank Story (2005), which won the 2006 Academy Award in the category Best Live Action Short Film.

Life and career
Sandel was born and raised in Calabasas, California, the son of Kathy (Hale) and Dan Sandel. His father is Israeli and his mother is American. He is Jewish. He studied Media Arts at the University of Arizona in Tucson where he also received a special certificate in Middle Eastern Studies. He went on to earn his Directing MFA from the University of Southern California's School of Cinema–Television. West Bank Story premiered at the Sundance Film Festival and has screened at over one hundred fifty film festivals worldwide, winning prizes from 30.

Sandel also directed a 2006 documentary, Wild West Comedy Show: 30 Days & 30 Nights - Hollywood to the Heartland, which premiered at the Toronto International Film Festival.

In 2015, Sandel's feature film directorial debut, teen comedy The DUFF, was released in theaters.

Sandel directed the horror comedy sequel Goosebumps 2: Haunted Halloween, which began filming in February 2018, and which was released in October of that year.

Filmography
Short films
 West Bank Story (2005)

Documentary
Wild West Comedy Show: 30 Days & 30 Nights – Hollywood to the Heartland (2006)

Television
Aim High (2013)
Shadowhunters (2018)

Feature films
 The DUFF (2015)
 When We First Met (2018)
 Goosebumps 2: Haunted Halloween  (2018)

References

External links 
 

American people of Israeli descent
20th-century American Jews
Directors of Live Action Short Film Academy Award winners
Living people
People from Calabasas, California
University of Arizona alumni
USC School of Cinematic Arts alumni
Film directors from California
1974 births
21st-century American Jews